Barry Morris is the CEO of Undo and former CEO of several software companies.

Early life and education
Barry Morris was raised in South Africa and educated in Great Britain. He has a degree in engineering from New College in Oxford University and an honorary doctorate in business administration from the IMC Association.

Career
Before 1994, Morris held senior management positions at Digital Equipment Corporation, Lotus Development Corporation, Protek Electronics Ltd., and Leading Technology, Inc.

Morris joined IONA Technologies, a distributed object technology company based in Dublin, Ireland, in 1994 and served as Vice President of Product Management and Chief Operation Officer before being named CEO in 2000.  Morris is credited with establishing the company headquarters in Waltham, Massachusetts.

Barry Morris was also the former CEO of StreamBase Systems, the co-founder and former CEO of NuoDB, and CEO of Undo

Board memberships
Barry Morris sits on the Advisory Board for the Irish American Business Association. He also serves on the board of the International School of Boston and the Sugan Theater Company.

References

Living people
American computer businesspeople
American technology company founders
Year of birth missing (living people)